Adnawali is a village in Kapurthala district, Punjab of State, India. The village is administrated by a Sarpanch, who is an elected representative of the village.

Demography 
As per Population Census 2011, the Adnawali village has population of 682, of which 373 are males while 309 are females. The population of children under the age of 6 years is 66, which is 9.68% of total population of Adnawali, and child sex ratio is approximately 886 higher than Punjab average of 846.

Caste  
The village has schedule caste (SC) constitutes 33.28% of total population of the village and it doesn't have any Schedule Tribe (ST) population.

Villages in Kapurthala

External links
  Villages in Kapurthala
 Kapurthala Villages List

References

Villages in Kapurthala district